Gregory P. Roman (born August 19, 1972) is an American football coach. He previously served as the offensive coordinator for the Baltimore Ravens of the National Football League (NFL). He held the position for four seasons and resigned from the team following the 2022 season. Prior to serving with the Baltimore Ravens, Roman was an assistant coach for the Buffalo Bills, San Francisco 49ers, Houston Texans and Carolina Panthers.

Early life and playing career
Roman was born in Atlantic City, New Jersey and grew up in nearby Ventnor. He and his two older brothers, Jeff and Jim,  were raised by his mom after his parents divorced. Roman never had a relationship with his father. At age 10, with his family strapped for cash, Roman got his first job as a paperboy for the Atlantic City newspaper The Press; during the summers he worked as a "runner" on the beaches of South Jersey. The money he made, in addition to helping to support his family, helped him to pay for his education at a nearby private high school. He graduated from Holy Spirit High School in Absecon, New Jersey where he played football for the Holy Spirit Spartans.  In his senior year at Holy Spirit, he was named to the All-South Jersey team. After graduation in 1991, Roman got an academic scholarship to attend John Carroll University in the Cleveland suburbs.

Roman played football for the  John Carroll Blue Streaks for three years, winning the starting job as a defensive lineman in his last two years. He earned All-Ohio Athletic Conference honorable mention status following his senior season in which he recorded 80 tackles and six sacks. That year the Blue Streaks defense allowed a league-low 98 points in 10 games and enabled the John Carroll University football team to capture a share of the OAC championship. Roman finished his collegiate career with 145 tackles, 20.0 tackles-for-loss and 9.5 sacks.

Greg Roman is married to Dana, and they have three children, Connor, Gregory, and Emily.

Coaching career

Carolina Panthers
Roman's first coaching job was with the Carolina Panthers in 1995, where he started as the unpaid strength and conditioning coach.

Houston Texans
In 2002, Roman was hired by the expansion Houston Texans as their tight ends and quarterbacks coach.

Baltimore Ravens (first stint)
In 2006, Roman was hired by the Baltimore Ravens as an offensive line assistant.

Atlantic City HS
In 2008, Roman returned to his alma mater and served as the offensive coordinator at Atlantic City High School. He was shutout by Mainland Regional 24-0 that season. Starting quarterback, Sky Glenn, led the nation in passing touchdowns and interceptions thrown. Sky Glenn is now a local clammer in the Atlantic City Area.

Stanford
In 2009, Roman was hired and served as Associate Head Coach at Stanford, under head coach Jim Harbaugh. In 2010, Roman was a finalist for the Broyles Award, given annually to the nation's top college football assistant coach.

San Francisco 49ers
When Harbaugh left Stanford in 2011 to become head coach of the San Francisco 49ers, Roman followed and was named the offensive coordinator. He remained at the position until 2014.

Buffalo Bills
On January 12, 2015, Roman was hired by the Buffalo Bills to be their offensive coordinator under newly hired head coach Rex Ryan. On September 16, 2016, Roman was relieved of his duties after a 37–31 loss to the New York Jets.

Baltimore Ravens (second stint)
  
In 2017, the Ravens hired Roman as a senior offensive assistant and tight ends coach under head coach John Harbaugh; in 2018 he was promoted to assistant head coach and tight ends coach.  In 2019, the Ravens opted to completely revamp the offense and the then offensive coordinator Marty Mornhinweg decided to retire.  Roman, who had coached Colin Kaepernick at San Francisco, was promoted to offensive coordinator and tasked with the development of a new, dynamic offense.  This new offense would be a combination of his experiences as a tight ends coach and the knowledge he had gained from reading hundreds of football books. Centered on the Ravens' new quarterback, Lamar Jackson and running back Mark Ingram II In Roman's first full season in charge of the Ravens' offense, after 12 games, the team averaged 33.8 points per game; best in the NFL.

On January 19, 2023, the Ravens announced that Roman stepped down and resigned as the team's offensive coordinator following the Ravens' loss in the Wld Card round of the 2022–23 NFL playoffs against the Cincinnati Bengals.

References

External links
 Baltimore Ravens profile

1972 births
Living people
Baltimore Ravens coaches
Buffalo Bills coaches
Carolina Panthers coaches
Houston Texans coaches
John Carroll Blue Streaks football players
National Football League offensive coordinators
San Francisco 49ers coaches
Stanford Cardinal football coaches
High school football coaches in New Jersey
Holy Spirit High School (New Jersey) alumni
Sportspeople from Atlantic City, New Jersey
People from Ventnor City, New Jersey
Players of American football from New Jersey